Puise is a village in Haapsalu urban municipality, Lääne County, in western Estonia. Prior to the 2017 Estonian municipality reforms, it was located in Ridala Parish.

Gallery

References

Villages in Lääne County